Dr. László Németh (born October 25, 1951) is a Hungarian former professional basketball coach and player. He has coached the national teams of Iceland, England, and Kuwait.

Playing career

Club career
Németh played with Honvéd Budapest. He retired in 1976 after recurring knee injuries.

National team career
Németh played 16 games with the Hungarian national basketball team between 1969 and 1976.

Coaching career

KR
Németh coached KR men's team from 1988 to 1990, where he was the Úrvalsdeild karla coach of the year in 1989 and 1990. He led the team to the Icelandic championship in 1990.

He coached KR-b during part of its Icelandic Cup run in 2006.

Iceland
Németh coached the Icelandic men's national basketball team from 1988 to 1990, leading it to a 7-13 record and gold at the 1988 European Promotion Cup for Men.

References

1951 births
Living people
Hungarian men's basketball players
Basketball players from Budapest
Hungarian expatriate basketball people in Kuwait
Hungarian expatriate sportspeople in Iceland
Hungarian expatriate basketball people in the United Arab Emirates
Hungarian expatriate sportspeople in England
Hungarian expatriate basketball people in Saudi Arabia
Expatriate basketball people in England
Úrvalsdeild karla (basketball) coaches
KR men's basketball coaches
Expatriate basketball people in Iceland
Hungarian basketball coaches
Basketball coaches of international teams